Bangkok Bank Football Club was a defunct semi-professional Thai football club based in Bangkok from Bangkok Bank. Bangkok Bank FC was founded 1955 and played in the top Thai football division, the Thai Premier League. Their home stadium was Bangkok Bank Ground.

History
The club dropped out of the Thai football system in 2008 after being relegated from the Thai Premier League. Bangkok Bank were certainly one of the biggest clubs in the Thai football scene, winning 11 Khor Royal Cup and 7 Kor Royal Cup titles before the Thai Premier League rose as we know it today. Bangkok Bank, were the first winners of the Premier League title in 1996/97 and represented Thailand in Asian club competitions.

Stadium and locations by season

Season by season record

P = Played
W = Games won
D = Games drawn
L = Games lost
F = Goals for
A = Goals against
Pts = Points
Pos = Final position
N/A = No answer

PLT = Thai League

QR1 = First Qualifying Round
QR2 = Second Qualifying Round
QR3 = Third Qualifying Round
QR4 = Fourth Qualifying Round
RInt = Intermediate Round
R1 = Round 1
R2 = Round 2
R3 = Round 3

R4 = Round 4
R5 = Round 5
R6 = Round 6
GR = Group Stage
QF = Quarter-finals
SF = Semi-finals
RU = Runners-up
S = Shared
W = Winners

Coaches
Coaches by Years (1990–2008)

Honours

Domestic
Kor Royal Cup
 Winner (8): 1964, 1966, 1967(Shared), 1981, 1984, 1986, 1989, 1994
Khǒr Royal Cup (Tier 2)
 Winner (6): 1963, 1966, 1968, 1969, 1971, 1978
 Queen's Cup
 Winner (3): 1970(Shared), 1983, 2000
 Thai FA Cup
 Winner (3): 1980, 1981(Shared), 1998
 League Cup
 Winner (1): 1988

Invitational
 Aga Khan Gold Cup
 Winner (1): 1981(shared)

Performance in AFC competitions
 Asian Club Championship: 10 appearances

1967: 2nd round
1969: Group Stage
1971: Group Stage
1986: Group Stage

1988: Group Stage
1991: Qualifying Stage
1992: Group Stage

1995: Second Round
1996: First Round
1998: First Round

 Asian Cup Winners Cup: 1 appearance
1999/00: 3rd place

Results

Notes

References

External links
 Bangkok Bank FC Webboard

 
Defunct football clubs in Thailand
Football clubs in Thailand
Association football clubs established in 1955
1955 establishments in Thailand
Thai League 1 clubs
Sport in Bangkok
Association football clubs disestablished in 2008
2008 disestablishments in Thailand
Financial services association football clubs in Thailand